Cory Tomczyk is an American businessman and Republican politician from Marathon County, Wisconsin.  He is a member of the Wisconsin State Senate, representing the 29th Senate district since January 2023.

Biography
Cory Tomczyk was born in north-central Wisconsin and has lived in the area of Mosinee, Wisconsin, since 1988.  Shortly after settling in the area, he started an industrial recycling business, Industrial Recyclers of Wisconsin (IROW), which he continues to operate 32 years later.

He was involved in local politics with the Republican Party of Wisconsin and was elected to the Mosinee school board.  During the COVID-19 pandemic, he protested against lockdown policies in Wisconsin.

In 2022, incumbent state senator Jerry Petrowski announced he would not run for re-election in the 29th Senate district.  A short time later, Tomczyk announced his candidacy for the Republican Party's nomination.  He faced a competitive primary and prevailed over his two opponents with 43% of the vote.  He went on to win the general election with 62%.

Electoral history

Wisconsin Senate (2022)

| colspan="6" style="text-align:center;background-color: #e9e9e9;"| Republican Primary, August 9, 2022

| colspan="6" style="text-align:center;background-color: #e9e9e9;"| General Election, November 7, 2022 (unofficial results)

References

External links
 Campaign website
 Cory Tomczyk at Wisconsin Vote

Living people
People from Mosinee, Wisconsin
Republican Party Wisconsin state senators
Year of birth missing (living people)